The 2011–12 Bayer Leverkusen season is the club's 108th year of existence.

Review and events
For the winter break, Bayer Leverkusen return to practice on 3 January 2012 at 10:00 CET (UTC+01) and will have a training camp in Lagos, Portugal, from 4 January to 13 January.

Competitions

Bundesliga

DFB-Pokal

UEFA Champions League

Group stage

Knockout phase

Round of 16

Player information

Roster and statistics

Transfers

In

Out

Kits

Sources

Bayer 04 Leverkusen
Bayer 04 Leverkusen seasons
Bayer Leverkusen